The Electoral division of Emu Bay was an electoral division in the Tasmanian Legislative Council of Australia. It existed for two years from 1997 to 1999 and never faced an election. The seat was a renaming of the old seat of West Devon, which was then abolished when the Council was reduced from 19 to 15 seats. It took its name from the original name of the town of Burnie.

Members

See also
Burnie, Tasmania
Tasmanian Legislative Council electoral divisions

References
Past election results for Emu Bay

Former electoral districts of Tasmania
Northern Tasmania
1999 disestablishments in Australia